Ivan Minatti (22 March 1924 – 9 June 2012) was a Slovene poet, translator, and editor. He started writing poetry before World War II, but principally belongs to the first postwar generation of Slovene poets. He is one of the best representatives of Slovene Intimism.

Life
Minatti was born in 1924 in Slovenske Konjice in northeastern Slovenia. His family moved first to Slovenj Gradec and then to Ljubljana while he was still a child. He attended Gymnasium in Ljubljana, finished it in 1943, and then enrolled in medical studies, but postponed his education to join the Partisans in 1944. After the war, he studied Slavic studies at the Faculty of Arts of the University of Ljubljana and graduated in 1952. He worked as an editor at Mladinska Knjiga publishers from 1947 until his retirement in 1984. He became a regular member of the Slovenian Academy of Sciences and Arts in 1991. He died at the age of 88 and was buried at Žale in Ljubljana.

Work
Minatti's poems, influenced by the horrors of the war, are lyrical and deal with modern-age resignation and melancholy. According to the poet Boris A. Novak, his work signified a radical break with collectivist postwar poetry and the start of a personal poetry, making Minatti one of the breakthrough Slovene poets of the 20th century. The poet and translator Veno Taufer characterised him as a rock-steady and at the same time of a soft heart and ascribed his success to his expression of human as well as social distress in the postwar Communist Slovenia. Minatti is known for his references to nature. According to the poet Ciril Zlobec, he used nature as a source of deep symbols and metaphors for man and his life.

Awards
Minatti won the Prešeren Fund Award in 1964 for his poetry collection You Have to Love Somebody. In 1972, he won the Sovre Award, bestowed for the best translations into Slovene, for his translations of lyrical poems by the Macedonian poet Kočo Racin and the Bosnian poet Izet Sarajlić. In 1985, he won the Prešeren Award for his poetry collection I Listen to the Silence Inside Me.

Poetry collections

 Off-Trail (1947)
 And the Spring Will Come (1955)
 You Have to Love Somebody (1963)
 The Wind Sings (1963)
 The Pain of the Unexperienced (1964)
 Poems (1971)
 The Face (1972)
 When I Am Silent and Good (1973)
 The Poems (1977) - with Janez Menart and Lojze Krakar
 I Eavesdrop on the Silence Within Me (1984)
 Behind the Closed Eyelids: Chosen Poems (1999)
 Minatti – Chosen Lyrical Poetry (2004)

References

1924 births
2012 deaths
Slovenian poets
Slovenian male poets
Slovenian editors
Slovenian translators
Yugoslav poets
Yugoslav editors
Yugoslav translators
Prešeren Award laureates
Members of the Slovenian Academy of Sciences and Arts
University of Ljubljana alumni
20th-century poets
20th-century translators
People from the Municipality of Slovenske Konjice
Yugoslav Partisans members